Mount Don Bosco is a mountain located in the Catskill Mountains of New York southeast of Ellenville. Shawangunk Ridge is located south, High Point is located northeast, Murray Hill is located east-northeast, Losees Hill is located south, and Mount Meenahga is located northwest of Mount Don Bosco.

References

Mountains of Ulster County, New York
Mountains of New York (state)